Tangier is a 1982 American-Moroccan thriller film directed by Michael E. Briant and starring Ronny Cox, Billie Whitelaw and Glynis Barber.

"Take the disappearance of a key British Intelligence Officer in Gibraltar, loaded with top secrets. Add a tough, down-on-his-luck ex-CIA agent with a murky past. Try a drop of blackmail. Garnish with two beautiful women. Sprinkle liberally with murder, treachery, and mayhem. Stir well till it all fizzes with danger and excitement that is Tangier. The result is a thriller that will grip you down to the last explosive moment. It's the thriller of the year. It's Tangier."
 from the cover of the Linked Ring VHS release 1982.

Cast
 Ronny Cox as Bob Steele 
 Billie Whitelaw as Louise 
 Glynis Barber as Beth 
 Ronald Lacey as Wedderburn 
 Oscar Quitak as Velatti 
 Jack Watson as Donovan 
 Ronald Fraser as Jenkins 
 Adel Frej as Ahmed 
 Benjamin Feitelson as Fisher 
 Peter Arne as Malen 
 David Collings as Major Greville 
 Connie Mason as Marsha 
 Nicholson Donnelly as Major Crawley
 Ronald Fraser

References

External links

1982 films
1980s spy thriller films
American spy thriller films
Moroccan drama films
Films shot in Gibraltar
Films set in Tangier
1980s English-language films
1980s American films